Bone mineral density quantitative trait locus 8 is a protein that in humans is encoded by the BMND8 gene.

References